The 1st World Mahjong Championship 2007 was held at the Hong Zhu Shan Hotel in Chengdu, Sichuan, China from November 1 to 5, in 2007. The official name of this event was "2007 The First Mahjong Cultural Exchange Congress and World Mahjong Championship". During the event, the Congress was held.

Competition
This competition is the official first world championship in Mahjong after World Mahjong Organization was founded in 2006.

Results
The names are ordered as Given name and Surname.

Individual

Team

References

External links

Mahjong world championships